The Sampaguita gas field is a natural gas field located in the South China Sea. It was discovered in 2011 and developed by Philex Petroleum. It began production in 2013 and produces natural gas and condensates. The total proven reserves of the Sampaguita gas field are around 4.6 trillion cubic feet (131 km³), and production is slated to be around 200 million cubic feet/day (5.7×105m³).

References

Natural gas fields in the Philippines
Geography of Palawan